Johann Junglas (February 12, 1898 – November 8, 1963) was a German politician of the Christian Democratic Union (CDU) and former member of the German Bundestag.

Life 
After the Second World War, he was one of the co-founders of the Christian Democratic Party (CDP) in Koblenz, which in 1947 was absorbed into the Rhineland-Palatinate state association of the CDU.

In 1946/47 he was a member of the Rhineland-Palatinate state assembly and subsequently of the Rhineland-Palatinate state parliament until 1951. In the first federal election in 1949 he was elected to the German Bundestag, of which he was a member until 1953. In parliament he represented the constituency of Ahrweiler.

Literature

References

1898 births
1963 deaths
Members of the Bundestag for Rhineland-Palatinate
Members of the Bundestag 1949–1953
Members of the Bundestag for the Christian Democratic Union of Germany
Members of the Landtag of Rhineland-Palatinate